Giambattista Busi (born 21 April 1968) is an Italian former racing driver.

References

1968 births
Living people
Italian racing drivers
International Formula 3000 drivers
Japanese Touring Car Championship drivers
20th-century Italian people